Stan Lee (1922–2018) was an American comic book writer and editor.

Stan or Stanley Lee may also refer to:

People
 Stan Lee (born 1956), lead guitarist of The Dickies
 Stan Lee (politician) (born 1961), American politician, member of the Kentucky House of Representatives
 Stanley R. Lee (died 1997), advertising executive and author of novels under the name Stan Lee
 Stanley Lee (bowls), English bowls player

Documentaries 
 With Great Power: The Stan Lee Story, 2010
 Stan Lee (documentary), 2023

See also 
 Stan (disambiguation)
 Stanley (disambiguation)
 Stanly (disambiguation)